The Strand Theatre and Arcade, also known as the Michigan Theatre and Arcade, is a former theatre building located at 211–219 South Washington Avenue in Lansing, Michigan. It was listed on the National Register of Historic Places in 1980.

History
In 1920, theater entrepreneur Walter Scott Butterfield commissioned architect John Eberson to design this theatre. Construction began in 1920 and was completed in 1921. The theatre originally seated 1750 people, and Butterfield promoted it as a vaudeville and stage venue. Acts appearing at the Strand included Al Jolson, Harry Houdini, Will Rogers, Marian Anderson, and Bing Crosby. However, by mid-1922, movies substantially replaced the live acts. In 1941, the building was extensively remodeled, adding Art Deco elements to the theatre facade, and renamed the Michigan Theatre. It closed as a movie house in 1980, and remained vacant for a number of years. 

In 1984, the building was redeveloped and converted into a mixed-use office and retail complex known as the Atrium Office Center. The exterior Art Deco elements were removed, and the facade returned to its original look. The rehabilitation focused on the atrium and the theatre lobby, and the auditorium portion was razed.

Description
The  Strand Theatre and Arcade is a large commercial red brick structure containing both a theatre and a two-story arcade. It is decorated with terra cotta, with Art Deco elements from the 1941 remodel. The facade is 109 feet wide, and two stories high, with a three-story gabled block over the center entrance. The entrance leads to a two-story, 20-foot-wide arcade, flanked with shops o nthe first floor and office space on the second.

References

		
National Register of Historic Places in Ingham County, Michigan
Art Deco architecture in Michigan
Buildings and structures completed in 1921